Florence Price Dwyer (July 4, 1902 – February 29, 1976) was an American Republican Party politician who represented much of Essex County, New Jersey in the United States House of Representatives from 1957 to 1973. From 1967 to 1973, she also represented parts of Union County, New Jersey.

She was the second woman to be elected to the United States House of Representatives from New Jersey. She was the first woman Republican from New Jersey elected to the House. Dwyer was an advocate for women's rights throughout her political career.

Early life and education
Dwyer was born Florence Louise Price in Reading, Pennsylvania.  She went to public school in Reading and Toledo, Ohio after moving there. Dwyer later moved to Elizabeth, New Jersey. She took courses at Rutgers Law School and became State Legislation Chairman of the New Jersey Federation of Business and Professional Women.

Political career
Dwyer served as an alternate delegate to the Republican National Convention in 1944 and 1948. She was then elected to the New Jersey General Assembly, where she served from 1950 to 1956. Assemblywoman Dwyer introduced the Equal Pay for Equal Work bill, which was passed in 1952. The bill criminalized "discrimination in the rate of wages on the basis of sex" and later became a model for federal legislation.

In 1956, Dwyer was elected to the United States House of Representatives for the first of eight terms. In 1962, she co-sponsored the Equal Pay Act, which was passed the following year. In 1970, she helped Representative Martha W. Griffiths to bring the Equal Rights Amendment to the floor of the House after it had stalled in committee decades earlier. The amendment, originally drafted by Alice Paul in 1923, passed in the House and Senate, but its deadline for ratification passed without approval by the required number of state legislatures. The ERA has since been reintroduced dozens of times without success.

Dwyer voted in favor of the Civil Rights Acts of 1957, 1960, 1964, and 1968, as well as the 24th Amendment to the U.S. Constitution and the Voting Rights Act of 1965. She was also a supporter of the Equal Rights Amendment. Dwyer supported the ERA as far back as her first term in Congress in 1957.

Dwyer was not a candidate for reelection in 1972. She retired to Elizabeth where she died in 1976. Her body is interred at St. Gertrude's Cemetery, Colonia, New Jersey.

See also
 Women in the United States House of Representatives

References

External links
 
 Inventory to the Records of New Jersey Federation of Business and Professional Women, 1919-1998

|-

1902 births
1976 deaths
Female members of the United States House of Representatives
Republican Party members of the New Jersey General Assembly
Politicians from Elizabeth, New Jersey
Politicians from Reading, Pennsylvania
Republican Party members of the United States House of Representatives from New Jersey
Women state legislators in New Jersey
20th-century American politicians
20th-century American women politicians